There are a number of listed buildings in Shropshire. The term "listed building", in the United Kingdom, refers to a building or structure designated as being of special architectural, historical, or cultural significance. Details of all the listed buildings are contained in the National Heritage List for England. They are categorised in three grades: Grade I consists of buildings of outstanding architectural or historical interest, Grade II* includes significant buildings of more than local interest and Grade II consists of buildings of special architectural or historical interest. Buildings in England are listed by the Secretary of State for Culture, Media and Sport on recommendations provided by English Heritage, which also determines the grading.

Some listed buildings are looked after by the National Trust or English Heritage while others are in private ownership or administered by trusts.

Listed buildings by grade
Grade I listed buildings in Shropshire
Grade II* listed buildings in Shropshire Council (A–G)
Grade II* listed buildings in Shropshire Council (H–Z)
Grade II* listed buildings in Telford and Wrekin

Listed buildings by civil parish

Shropshire

Listed buildings in Abdon, Shropshire 
Listed buildings in Acton Burnell
Listed buildings in Acton Round
Listed buildings in Acton Scott
Listed buildings in Adderley
Listed buildings in Alberbury with Cardeston
Listed buildings in Albrighton, Bridgnorth
Listed buildings in All Stretton
Listed buildings in Alveley
Listed buildings in Ashford Bowdler
Listed buildings in Ashford Carbonell
Listed buildings in Astley, Shropshire
Listed buildings in Astley Abbotts
Listed buildings in Aston Botterell
Listed buildings in Aston Eyre
Listed buildings in Atcham
Listed buildings in Badger, Shropshire
Listed buildings in Barrow, Shropshire
Listed buildings in Baschurch
Listed buildings in Bayston Hill
Listed buildings in Bedstone
Listed buildings in Beckbury
Listed buildings in Berrington, Shropshire
Listed buildings in Bettws-y-Crwyn
Listed buildings in Bicton, Shrewsbury
Listed buildings in Billingsley, Shropshire
Listed buildings in Bishop's Castle
Listed buildings in Bitterley
Listed buildings in Boningale
Listed buildings in Boraston
Listed buildings in Boscobel
Listed buildings in Bridgnorth
Listed buildings in Bromfield, Shropshire
Listed buildings in Broseley
Listed buildings in Bucknell, Shropshire
Listed buildings in Buildwas
Listed buildings in Burford, Shropshire
Listed buildings in Burwarton
Listed buildings in Cardington, Shropshire
Listed buildings in Caynham
Listed buildings in Chelmarsh
Listed buildings in Cheswardine
Listed buildings in Chetton
Listed buildings in Child's Ercall
Listed buildings in Chirbury with Brompton
Listed buildings in Church Preen
Listed buildings in Church Pulverbatch
Listed buildings in Church Stretton
Listed buildings in Claverley
Listed buildings in Clee St. Margaret
Listed buildings in Cleobury Mortimer
Listed buildings in Cleobury North
Listed buildings in Clive, Shropshire
Listed buildings in Clun
Listed buildings in Clunbury
Listed buildings in Clungunford
Listed buildings in Cockshutt, Shropshire
Listed buildings in Colebatch, Shropshire
Listed buildings in Condover
Listed buildings in Coreley
Listed buildings in Cound
Listed buildings in Craven Arms
Listed buildings in Cressage
Listed buildings in Culmington
Listed buildings in Deuxhill
Listed buildings in Diddlebury
Listed buildings in Ditton Priors
Listed buildings in Donington, Shropshire
Listed buildings in Eardington
Listed buildings in Easthope
Listed buildings in Eaton-under-Heywood
Listed buildings in Edgton
Listed buildings in Ellesmere Rural
Listed buildings in Ellesmere Urban
Listed buildings in Farlow, Shropshire
Listed buildings in Ford, Shropshire
Listed buildings in Frodesley
Listed buildings in Glazeley
Listed buildings in Great Hanwood
Listed buildings in Great Ness
Listed buildings in Greete
Listed buildings in Grinshill
Listed buildings in Hadnall
Listed buildings in Harley, Shropshire
Listed buildings in Heath, Shropshire
Listed buildings in Highley
Listed buildings in Hinstock
Listed buildings in Hodnet
Listed buildings in Hope Bagot
Listed buildings in Hope Bowdler
Listed buildings in Hopesay
Listed buildings in Hopton Cangeford
Listed buildings in Hopton Castle
Listed buildings in Hopton Wafers
Listed buildings in Hordley
Listed buildings in Hughley, Shropshire
Listed buildings in Ightfield
Listed buildings in Kemberton
Listed buildings in Kenley, Shropshire
Listed buildings in Kinlet
Listed buildings in Kinnerley
Listed buildings in Knockin
Listed buildings in Leebotwood
Listed buildings in Leighton and Eaton Constantine
Listed buildings in Little Ness
Listed buildings in Llanfair Waterdine
Listed buildings in Llanyblodwel
Listed buildings in Llanymynech and Pant
Listed buildings in Longden
Listed buildings in Longnor, Shropshire
Listed buildings in Loppington
Listed buildings in Ludford, Shropshire
Listed buildings in Ludlow (northern area)
Listed buildings in Ludlow (southern area)
Listed buildings in Lydbury North
Listed buildings in Lydham
Listed buildings in Mainstone
Listed buildings in Market Drayton
Listed buildings in Melverley
Listed buildings in Middleton Scriven
Listed buildings in Milson, Shropshire
Listed buildings in Minsterley
Listed buildings in Monkhopton
Listed buildings in Montford, Shropshire
Listed buildings in More, Shropshire
Listed buildings in Moreton Corbet and Lee Brockhurst
Listed buildings in Moreton Say
Listed buildings in Morville, Shropshire
Listed buildings in Much Wenlock
Listed buildings in Munslow
Listed buildings in Myddle and Broughton
Listed buildings in Myndtown
Listed buildings in Nash, South Shropshire
Listed buildings in Neen Savage
Listed buildings in Neen Sollars
Listed buildings in Neenton
Listed buildings in Newcastle on Clun
Listed buildings in Norbury, Shropshire
Listed buildings in Norton in Hales
Listed buildings in Onibury
Listed buildings in Oswestry
Listed buildings in Oswestry Rural
Listed buildings in Petton
Listed buildings in Pimhill
Listed buildings in Pitchford
Listed buildings in Pontesbury
Listed buildings in Prees
Listed buildings in Quatt Malvern
Listed buildings in Ratlinghope
Listed buildings in Richard's Castle (Shropshire)
Listed buildings in Romsley, Shropshire
Listed buildings in Ruckley and Langley
Listed buildings in Rudge, Shropshire
Listed buildings in Rushbury
Listed buildings in Ruyton-XI-Towns
Listed buildings in Ryton, Shropshire
Listed buildings in Selattyn and Gobowen
Listed buildings in Shawbury
Listed buildings in Sheinton
Listed buildings in Sheriffhales
Listed buildings in Shifnal
Listed buildings in Shipton, Shropshire
Listed buildings in Shrewsbury (northwest central area)
Listed buildings in Shrewsbury (southeast central area)
Listed buildings in Shrewsbury (outer areas)
Listed buildings in Sibdon Carwood
Listed buildings in Sidbury, Shropshire
Listed buildings in Smethcott
Listed buildings in St Martin's, Shropshire
Listed buildings in Stanton Lacy
Listed buildings in Stanton Long
Listed buildings in Stanton upon Hine Heath
Listed buildings in Stockton, Worfield
Listed buildings in Stoke St. Milborough
Listed buildings in Stoke upon Tern
Listed buildings in Stottesdon
Listed buildings in Stowe, Shropshire
Listed buildings in Sutton Maddock
Listed buildings in Sutton upon Tern
Listed buildings in Tasley
Listed buildings in Tong, Shropshire
Listed buildings in Uffington, Shropshire
Listed buildings in Upton Cressett
Listed buildings in Upton Magna
Listed buildings in Welshampton and Lyneal
Listed buildings in Wem Rural
Listed buildings in Wem Urban
Listed buildings in Wentnor
Listed buildings in West Felton
Listed buildings in Westbury, Shropshire
Listed buildings in Weston Rhyn
Listed buildings in Weston-under-Redcastle
Listed buildings in Wheathill
Listed buildings in Whitchurch Rural
Listed buildings in Whitchurch Urban
Listed buildings in Whittington, Shropshire
Listed buildings in Whitton, Shropshire
Listed buildings in Whixall
Listed buildings in Wistanstow
Listed buildings in Withington, Shropshire
Listed buildings in Woolstaston
Listed buildings in Woore
Listed buildings in Worfield
Listed buildings in Worthen with Shelve
Listed buildings in Wroxeter and Uppington

Telford and Wrekin

Listed buildings in Chetwynd, Shropshire
Listed buildings in Chetwynd Aston and Woodcote
Listed buildings in Church Aston
Listed buildings in Dawley Hamlets
Listed buildings in Edgmond
Listed buildings in Ercall Magna
Listed buildings in Eyton upon the Weald Moors
Listed buildings in Great Dawley
Listed buildings in Hadley and Leegomery
Listed buildings in Ketley
Listed buildings in Kynnersley
Listed buildings in Lawley and Overdale
Listed buildings in Lilleshall and Donnington
Listed buildings in Little Wenlock
Listed buildings in Madeley, Shropshire
Listed buildings in Newport, Shropshire
Listed buildings in Oakengates
Listed buildings in Preston upon the Weald Moors
Listed buildings in Rodington, Shropshire
Listed buildings in St George's and Priorslee
Listed buildings in Stirchley and Brookside
Listed buildings in The Gorge
Listed buildings in Tibberton and Cherrington
Listed buildings in Waters Upton
Listed buildings in Wellington, Shropshire
Listed buildings in Wrockwardine
Listed buildings in Wrockwardine Wood and Trench

Churches
Grade I listed churches in Shropshire

References

 
Lists of listed buildings in Shropshire